Franz von Vecsey (born Ferenc Vecsey; 23 March 18935 April 1935) was a Hungarian violinist and composer, who became a well-known virtuoso in Europe through the early 20th century.

Early life and career

He was born in Budapest and began his violin studies with his father, Lajos Vecsey. At the age of 8 he entered the studio of Jenő Hubay. Two years later, aged 10, he played for Joseph Joachim in Berlin (making his début at "Beethoven Halle" on 17 May 1903) and subsequently became known as a stellar child prodigy virtuoso.

He became one of the pre-eminent violinists in Europe in the 1910s and 1920s, at one point touring with Béla Bartók as his piano accompanist.  Aged only 12, he became the re-dedicatee of Jean Sibelius' Violin Concerto in D minor in 1905, when the original dedicatee, Willy Burmester, refused to play the work after he was unable to appear at the premiere of the revised version, which was premiered by Karel Halíř instead.  Vecsey championed the Sibelius concerto, first performing it when he was only 13. He was the dedicatee of Hubay's Violin Concerto No.3. He also spent time composing, and wrote a number of virtuosic salon pieces for the violin.

Later life and career

From 1926 until his death, he lived with his wife in Venice, at the "Palazzo Giustinian de'Vescovi" on Canal Grande. His career steadily faltered after the First World War, as he grew tired of constant touring and wanted to concentrate more on conducting.

Illness and death
By the 1930s, he was about to embark on that dream, but it suddenly curtailed in 1935, when he became seriously ill with a pulmonary embolism that grew through much of his life. He sought medical care in Rome, where he received surgery. The operation was unsuccessful, and Vecsey succumbed to the disease at the age of 42.

Selected compositions
Violin solo
  in C minor (1914); dedicated to Jenő Hubay

Violin and piano
  (1934); transcription based on the Rondo from Violin Concerto No. 2 by Niccolò Paganini
 Caprice in F major (1913)
  (1933)
 Caprice No. 1 "" in A minor (1916)
 Caprice No. 2 "" in F major (1916)
 Caprice No. 3 ""
 Caprice No. 4 ""
 Caprice No. 5 "" (1917)
 Caprice No. 6 ""
 Caprice No. 7 ""
 Caprice No. 8 ""
 Caprice No. 9 ""
 Caprice No. 10 ""
 
  (1933)
  (1913)
  in G major (1913)
  (1921)
     No. 1 – 
 Mariä Wiegenlied (1934); transcription of Max Reger's Op. 76, No. 52
  (1912)
     No. 1 –  (A minor)
     No. 2 –  (E minor)
     No. 3 –  (E major)
 
 
  in G minor (1924)
  (1921); Nos. 3~5 also for 2 violins and piano
     No. 1 – 
     No. 2 – 
     No. 3 – 
     No. 4 – 
     No. 5 –  ...
     No. 6 – 
     No. 7 – 
     No. 8 – 
  (1913)
  (1933)
  in C minor (1913)

References

External links
 

1893 births
1935 deaths
Hungarian classical musicians
Hungarian classical violinists
Male classical violinists
Hungarian composers
Hungarian male composers
Fonotipia Records artists
20th-century composers
20th-century classical violinists
Deaths from pulmonary embolism
20th-century Hungarian male musicians